The Andy Warhol Story is a 1966 underground film directed by Andy Warhol with cinematography by Paul Morrissey, and starring Edie Sedgwick and Rene Ricard (as Andy Warhol).

According to the Warhol Stars website, the film was made in November 1966, and is two reels long.

See also
Andy Warhol filmography

References

External links
The Andy Warhol Story at IMDB
The Andy Warhol Story at WarholStars

1966 films
Films directed by Andy Warhol
1960s English-language films
1960s American films